Caller Name Presentation (CNAP) or Caller Name Delivery (CNAM) is used in US-based telephone networks to provide name identification of the calling party. The CNAM information is most often displayed in Caller ID. The information could be the person's name or a company name. The caller's name can also be blocked and display “restricted”, or if technical failures occur “not available”.

In Canada, the caller name information can be applied either by the client's own equipment (PBX), or by the originating carrier. The altering of caller ID information is allowed, provided it does not violate regulations in place regarding spoofing or fraud.

In the USA, the caller's name, or CNAM information, is not sent during a call. Rather, the terminating carrier is responsible for providing the Caller ID information to its customer. The terminating carrier performs a database lookup using the caller's phone number to obtain the name information to display with Caller ID. If the data is with another carrier, then the terminating carrier must perform a lookup and pay a small "dip fee" to the carrier hosting the information. Wholesale rates for the fee are on the order of $0.002 to $0.006 per database dip ($200 to $600 per 100,000 calls).

Incorrect Caller ID information can be displayed under a variety of circumstances. The customer's carrier may not perform the database lookup and may supply old information. Or, the customer's carrier may perform the database lookup but get incorrect information from the database owner. In this case, the database owner has stale information (and not the terminating carrier). Or, the Caller ID information may be spoofed.

Incumbent Local Exchange Carriers (ILEC) usually provide the most correct information. ILECs have a huge database of their own CNAM data, and ILECs are willing to pay the CNAM database dip fee to another ILEC or a Competitive Local Exchange Carrier (CLEC) to obtain the CNAM data.

See also
 Caller ID
 Line Information Database
 Local number portability
 Location Routing Number
 Dip Fee Fraud
 Signalling System No. 7

References

External links
 the 3GPP, the standardisation body for GSM and UMTS

GSM standard
Telecommunications infrastructure